John Parks Almand (May 8, 1885 – March 24, 1969) was an American architect who practiced in Arkansas from 1912 to 1962.  Among other works, he designed the Art Deco Hot Springs Medical Arts Building, which was the tallest building in Arkansas from 1930 to 1958.  Several of his works, including the Medical Arts Building and Little Rock Central High School, are listed on the National Register of Historic Places.

Biography
He was born in Lithonia, Georgia.  He received a bachelor of science degree from Emory College in 1907 and subsequently received a bachelor of architecture degree from Columbia University in 1911.  He then worked as the head of the architecture department for a large engineering company in Cuba for one year.  In 1912, he moved to Arkansas to work for the firm of Charles L. Thompson.  He formed his own firm in 1914.  He suffered a stroke in 1962 and died in 1969.

Works

A number of his works are listed on the National Register of Historic Places.  His works include (with attribution as in sources):
Almand House (c. 1922), 324 West Daisy Bates Drive, Little Rock, Arkansas (Almand, John Parks)
Block Realty-Baker House, 1900 Beechwood, Little Rock, Arkansas (Almand, John Parks), NRHP-listed
Couchwood, main lodge (built in rustic style with red cedar logs from Oregon), 601 Couchwood Road, Hot Springs, Arkansas (Almand, John Parks), part of the NRHP-listed Couchwood Historic District
Crossett Methodist Church, 500 Main Street, Crossett, Arkansas (Almand, John Parks), NRHP-listed
First Church of Christ, Scientist, 20th and Louisiana Streets, Little Rock, Arkansas (Almand, John Parks), NRHP-listed
First Presbyterian Church (Little Rock), 123 E. Eighth Street, Little Rock, Arkansas (Almand, John Parks), NRHP-listed
First Presbyterian Church (Lonoke), 304 South Center Street, Lonoke, Arkansas (Almand, John Parks), NRHP-listed
First United Methodist Church, East 4th and Spring Streets, Fordyce, Arkansas (Almand, John Parks), NRHP-listed
Land's End Plantation, 1 Land's End Lane, Scott, Arkansas (Almand, John Parks), NRHP-listed
Lane Hotel, 121 West Poplar Street, Rogers, Arkansas (Almand, John Parks), NRHP-listed
Little Rock Central High School, 14th and Park Streets, Little Rock, Arkansas (Almand, Delony, Mann, Stern & Wittenbrg), NRHP-listed
Medical Arts Building (1930), now known as the Central Tower, 236 Central Avenue, Hot Springs, Arkansas (Almand & Stuck), NRHP-listed
Bentonville High School, 410 Northwest Second Street, Bentonville, Arkansas (Almand, John Park), NRHP-listed
U. M. Rose School (1916), now known as the James Monroe Cox Administration Building, 900 West Daisy Bates Drive, Little Rock, Arkansas (Almand, John Parks), part of the NRHP-listed Philander Smith College Historic District
Portland United Methodist Church, 300 North Main Street, Portland, Arkansas (Almand, John Parks), NRHP-listed

References

1885 births
1969 deaths
20th-century American architects
Columbia Graduate School of Architecture, Planning and Preservation alumni
Emory University alumni
Artists from Little Rock, Arkansas
People from Lithonia, Georgia